Jason Bell may refer to: 
Jason Bell (photographer) (born 1969), British portrait and fashion photographer
Jason Bell (rugby league) (born 1971), former New Zealand rugby player
Jason Bell (American football) (born 1978), former cornerback for the NFL's New York Giants